The Gibson SG is a solid-body electric guitar model introduced by Gibson in 1961 as the Gibson Les Paul SG. It remains in production today in many variations of the initial design. The SG Standard is Gibson's best-selling model of all time. SG stands for "solid guitar."

Origins
In 1960, Gibson Les Paul sales were significantly lower than in previous years. The following year, the flat-topped, mahogany bodied Les Paul design was given a thinner, more contoured body with a double cutaway. Not only did this make the upper frets more accessible, it was further eased by moving the neck joint outwards by three frets. The simpler body construction significantly reduced production costs, and the new Les Paul, with its slender neck profile and small heel where it joined the body, was advertised as having the "fastest neck in the world".

However, the redesign was done without knowledge of Les Paul himself. Although the new guitar was popular, he strongly disliked it. Problems with the strength of the body and neck made Paul dissatisfied with the new guitar. At the same time, Paul was going through a public divorce from wife and vocalist partner Mary Ford, and his popularity was dwindling as music tastes had changed in the early 1960s. Paul asked lifelong friend and former President of Gibson Ted McCarty to withhold his $1 royalty per guitar, and Gibson mutually agreed to end the contract.

Gibson also honored Les Paul's request to remove his name from the guitar, and the new model was renamed "SG", which stood for "Solid Guitar". Les Paul's name was officially removed in 1963, but the SG continued to feature Les Paul nameplates and truss rod covers until the end of 1963.

In the early-to-mid 1960s Gibson's parent corporation, Chicago Musical Instruments, revived the Kalamazoo brand name for a short time. Later models of the  KG-1 and KG-2 featured a body style similar to the Gibson SG, effectively creating a budget-line model until the brand was dropped in the late 1960s. Gibson currently makes lower-cost, internationally sourced versions of the SG at their subsidiary Epiphone.

Because of its ease of play, comfort to hold, popularity, and vintage heritage, the body style of the SG is often copied by other manufacturers, although much less frequently than the Les Paul and the Fender Stratocaster.

Design
The SG generally has a solid mahogany body, with a black pickguard. The 24.75" scale mahogany neck joins the body at the 19th or 22nd fret. Early models had a smaller neck joint with a longer tenon. This neck design provided access above the 16th fret. Epiphone-made bolt-on neck models still use a 16th fret neck joint. The SG's set neck is shallower than the Gibson Les Paul's. The SG features the traditional Gibson combination of two or three humbucker pickups or P90 pickups and a Tune-o-matic bridge assembly, wraparound bridge, or vibrato tailpiece, depending on the model.

The SG Standard features pearloid trapezoid fretboard inlays, as well as fretboard binding and inlaid pearl "Gibson" logo and crown; the mid-level SG Special features pearloid dot inlays and an inlaid pearl "Gibson" logo, without a crown. The Standard has a volume and a tone control for each individual pickup, and a three-way switch that allows the player to select either the bridge pickup, the neck pickup, or both together. The SG does not include switching to coil split the humbuckers in stock form.

Some models use body woods other than mahogany; examples include the swamp ash SG Special, the SG Zoot Suit, made using multiple birch wood laminate, and the SG Voodoo, the 2009 Raw Power, and some walnut bodied 1970s models. High-end models, including the Diablo, occasionally sport decorative maple caps, carved tops, and gold hardware.

Models and variations

At the launch of the SG in 1961, Gibson offered four 
variants of the SG; the SG Junior (a stripped-down version of the standard, analogous to the Les Paul Junior), the SG Special, the SG Standard, and the top-of-the-line SG Custom.

As of 2010 Gibson's current core variants were the SG Standard and the SG Special. Over the years, Gibson has offered many variations of the SG, and continues to manufacture special editions, including models such as the Special and Faded Special, Supreme, Artist Signature SGs, Menace, and Gothic, as well as the premium-priced VOS reissues of the sixties SG Standard and Custom.

Models produced between 1961 and early 1966 have the original small pickguard; in late 1966 the guitar was redesigned slightly, first with a longer, more robust neck joint, and then came the modern larger semi-symmetrical "batwing" pickguard. This design continued until late 1971 or early 1972, when variations of the SG were sold with a raised Les Paul style pickguard and a front-mounted control plate. The low-end SG-100 and the P-90 equipped SG-200 appeared during this time, as well as the luxurious SG Pro and SG Deluxe guitars. Vibrato (tremolo arm) tailpieces were also introduced as options.

In 1972 the design went back to the original style pickguard and rear-mounted controls but with the neck then set further into the body, joining roughly at the 20th fret. By the end of the seventies, the SG models returned to the original sixties styling, and modern (1991–present) standard and special models have mostly returned to the 1967–1969 styling and construction, with a few exceptions; various reissues and other models of the SG still retain the original 1961–1967 styling.

In 1979, a low-cost SG made of walnut wood was introduced called "The SG." It had a clear finish and an ebony fingerboard and was accompanied by low-cost "Les Paul" and "ES 335" type guitars. "The Paul" was also made from walnut, but "The ES" was made out of solid mahogany (rather than the semi-solid body they usually produced). All three guitars were discontinued after about a year, replaced by the "firebrand" series, again made of mahogany. Also in 1979 a limited edition model, the SG Exclusive was produced.  Visually similar to the SG Standard of the time, the special features included an ebony fretboard, two Dirty Fingers humbucker pickups, and a master volume, two tone controls, and rotary coil tap that gradually eliminated one coil from each humbucker.  The finish was black with cream color plastics and the truss rod cover read "Exclusive".

In 1980, the first SG manufactured with "active" factory pickups was introduced. Gibson experimented with an SG that included the same Moog active electronics that had previously been used in another Gibson model, the RD Artist. The resulting SG had a slightly thicker body to accommodate the extra circuitry, and was dubbed the "Gibson SG-R1". The SG-R1 was renamed the "SG Artist" in 1981, and was discontinued shortly afterwards. Approximately 200 active SGs were produced.

In 2008, Gibson introduced the Robot SG, which feature a motorized tuning system developed by Tronical.  Limited-edition variants include the SG Robot Special and the limited-edition Robot SG LTD.  The Robot system was designed to be convenient for players who need to frequently change tunings, without requiring them to manually tune or carry several guitars; however, they also carry a significant price premium.

Around 2000 through 2009, Gibson introduced the SG Classic, which harked back to a Junior/Special type design, with bound mahogany fret board with dot inlays and two P-90 pickups, with a thin '60s neck profile.

In 2009, Gibson introduced the Raw Power line of SGs, which have an all-maple body, unbound maple neck and fretboard, and unique colors not previously seen in SGs.  These models are priced between the entry-level Specials and the more expensive Standards.  The year 2009 also brought the Guitar Center-exclusive SG Standard with Coil Taps available in both 50s and 60s style necks.

In 2013 Gibson released the new Gibson SG Baritone. This SG comes in Alpine white and has 24 frets. It comes tuned down two and a half steps to B-E-A-D-F#-B. It is made with a full mahogany body, Richlite fretboard 496R (Ceramic) Bridge Position	500T (Ceramic) pickups and a tune-o-matic bridge.

Gibson's EB-3, EB-0, EDS-1275, and later model of Melody Maker and Kalamazoo also shared or once shared SG-shaped bodies, but these are not the members of the SG family.

Epiphone also offers a range of value-priced models, including a model with 1960s styling, sold as the G-400. These models often feature simpler construction than their Gibson counterparts, although they also often implement a number of features missing from production Gibson models; examples include the period-correct 1961 SG Special's wraparound bridge (unavailable on any Gibson SG Special production model as of 2013), the 22" scale SG Express, the metal-oriented Prophecy line (equipped with high-output humbuckers and unique inlays), and a replica of the Gibson EDS-1275, popularized by Jimmy Page.

Unique SGs

Sister Rosetta Tharpe played a white Gibson Les Paul SG with three humbucking pickups, customized with an old-style maestro vibrato. 
Angus Young of AC/DC occasionally uses a custom-made SG with lightning-bolt inlays, based on a custom model originally produced by luthier John Diggins. Since then, Young has collaborated with Gibson to make the Angus Young SG which features a custom-designed Humbucker in the bridge position, a '57 Classic in the neck position and the lightning-bolt inlays.
Robby Krieger of The Doors used a Gibson SG Standard starting in 1965. Gibson produced a limited run of 150 SG's which incorporate many of Krieger's favorite components of various SG's.
Bernard Sumner of Joy Division and New Order used a Gibson SG Standard in 1976 (particularly used on album Closer in 1980)
Gillian Gilbert of New Order used a Gibson SG Standard in 1980 (on album "Movement")
 Eric Clapton used a 1964 Gibson SG Standard starting in 1967 while in Cream. This guitar was known as the "Fool" guitar, as it was painted by the Dutch artists known collectively as The Fool. In spring 1968, the SG was loaned to Jackie Lomax, an associate of George Harrison. The "Fool" was later sold to Todd Rundgren for $500 before eventually being sold to a private collector for about $500,000.
 Tony Iommi of Black Sabbath owns several custom-made black left-handed Gibson SGs with white cross-shaped fretboard inlays. Epiphone produces a similar guitar as the Tony Iommi G-400. Iommi's original SG (used on the early Sabbath albums) was a cherry red, left-handed 1964 SG Special with P-90 pickups.
 John Cipollina of Quicksilver Messenger Service used a custom Gibson SG with custom pickguards in the shape of bat-like figures, as well as the fret board being customized with unique patterns.
 Music Machine made a limited run of 20 Stinger SG's in 2003. Ten were standards and ten were customs.
 Mike Ness of Social Distortion played a black SG in the late 70s and early 80s, with the Social Distortion logo on it, as well as a white Joan Jett and the Blackhearts bumper sticker. It can be seen on the cover of the compilation album Mainliner: Wreckage From the Past.
 Mike Oldfield used a modified 1963 SG with a guitar synthesizer pickup to control a Roland GR300 Module for some of his guitar sounds on his 1980s albums such as 1983's Crises (including "Shadow on the Wall"), 1984's Discovery (including the title track) and 1987's Islands (including "The Wind Chimes") as well as single-only tracks from this period such as 1984's "In The Pool" and 1986's "Shine".
Tommy Bolin when in Zephyr used a 1963 SG.
 In 1992, the Gibson Custom Shop introduced a "premium plus" reissue of the '67 SG.  There was an estimated run of 100 of these instruments.  It included three '57 humbuckers, ABR-1 bridge, ebony fingerboard, slim tapered neck and a mother-of-pearl block.  There were no certificates issued from Gibson on this particular run.
 In 1998 Gibson introduced a rarer, higher-specification version of the SG Special—The SG Special Limited Edition. It came with an ebony fingerboard, factory gold hardware, and two gold array Humbuckers, and included a Gibson gigbag.
 The 2015 Eden of Coronet guitar which earned the title of most valuable guitar in the world.

Differences from the Les Paul

The SG has a thinner, and more contoured body than the Les Paul, making it much lighter and more comfortable. The lighter, thinner, one-layer body means the SG, unlike the Les Paul, is particularly suitable for harmonic feedback playing techniques. The SG's neck profile is typically shallower, and thinner than that of the Les Paul, though this varies between production years and individual guitars. The SG also lacks the carved maple top and body binding of the Les Paul.  Unlike the Les Paul's neck, which joins the body at the 16th fret, the SG's neck joins the body at the 22nd fret, which allows easier access to higher frets. This also makes the neck joint somewhat flexible, and players have exploited this factor in extended techniques by shaking the guitar to induce a vibrato effect such as Pete Townshend at the 1970 Isle of Wight festival. Despite the differences in body design, the SG and Les Paul models share similar electronics and controls. The sound of the SG is often described as having more "bite" (midrange emphasis) than a Les Paul, as both pickups are closer to the guitar's bridge.

Notable SG users

See also 
 Gibson Les Paul
 Gibson Les Paul Special—the first model named "Gibson SG Special" (1959–1961).
 Gibson SG Special
 Gibson SG Junior
 Gibson EB-0
 Gibson EB-3
 Gibson EDS-1275
 Epiphone G-400

Notes

References

Bibliography

External links

  
 Details on SGs used by Pete Townshend
 BBC News item regarding George Harrison's Gibson SG

1961 musical instruments
SG
The Beatles' musical instruments